Thulth al-Zudi is a sub-district located in Kharif District, 'Amran Governorate, Yemen. Thulth al-Zudi had a population of 4578 according to the 2004 census.

References 

Sub-districts in Kharif District